Mátyás Várkonyi (born September 4, 1950) is one of the most renowned musical composers in Hungary. He finished his studies in the academy of Béla Bartók.

He was a founding member of the band Generál in 1971. By 1975 General became renowned all over Europe and was voted "Band of the year" in Hungary. All their albums were distributed across Europe. It was the first East European band to top charts in Western Europe – e.g. in the Netherlands with the song "Everybody Join Us" single in 1975.

In 1980 he was one of the founders of the Rock Theatre, Hungary's first musical theatre later became its musical director and director of the theatre. In 1986 he won the Ferenc Erkel prize. 
Awards: Wolves, won first prize for best music and best choreography in Helsinki International Music Festival in 1983.
Other plays like the Starmakers, Stars of Eger (Egri Csillagok), Dorian Gray() and The puppet show man were huge successes both in the Hungarian and the foreign stages.

Shows

Örvényben, 1981, musical,
Starmakers, 1981, the first Hungarian Rock opera
Wolves, 1982, "rock fantasy"
The puppet show man, 1985, musical
Félőlény 1989, children's-musical,
Dorian Gray 1990, musical,()
Rock-Odüsszeia 1994
Eclipse of the Crescent Moon (Egri Csillagok), 1996, musical
Will Shakespeare or who you will, 1997, musical
Mata Hari 2002, musical
Ifipark 2003, musical

Hungarian musical theatre composers
Living people
1950 births